The 74th Tony Awards were held on September 26, 2021, to recognize achievement in Broadway productions during the 2019–20 season. After being delayed due to the COVID-19 pandemic in New York City, the ceremony was held at the Winter Garden Theatre and was broadcast in two separate parts on CBS and Paramount+. Audra McDonald and Leslie Odom Jr. served as hosts.

The musical Jagged Little Pill led the nominations with 15, while the play with the most nominations was Slave Play, with 12. At the ceremony, Moulin Rouge! won ten awards, including Best Musical, becoming the production with the most wins of the season. The Old Vic production of A Christmas Carol won five awards, and The Inheritance won four, including Best Play. At 90 years old, Lois Smith became the oldest performer to win a Tony Award for acting, receiving the award for Featured Actress in a Play.

Background
Originally scheduled to be held on June 7, 2020, at Radio City Music Hall in New York City and televised by CBS, the ceremony was postponed indefinitely due to the COVID-19 pandemic. Nominations were originally scheduled to be announced on April 28, 2020. Various receptions were scheduled to be held, including the Meet the Nominees Press reception (April 30) and Tony Nominees luncheon (May 19). At the Tony Honors reception, the Tony Honors for Excellence in the Theatre award was to be presented. On March 25, 2020, it was announced that the ceremony and all associated events had been postponed indefinitely due to the COVID-19 pandemic in the United States. New York had ordered the closure of all Broadway theatres on March 12 due to restrictions on gatherings. The ceremony's broadcaster CBS aired a sing-along version of the film adaptation of Grease on the Tony Awards' originally-scheduled night.

On August 21, 2020, it was announced that the ceremony would be held virtually later in the year, with further details to be announced at a later date. No subsequent date in the year was ever set. The nominations were announced on October 15, 2020, by James Monroe Iglehart. Voting for the Tony Awards was held from March 1–15, 2021, and the ceremony was announced to be held in conjunction with the reopening of Broadway. Jagged Little Pill led the nominations with fifteen, and Slave Plays twelve nominations broke the record for most nominations for a non-musical play (11) set by Angels in America at the 2018 ceremony.

Ceremony information
On May 26, 2021, it was announced that the ceremony would be held on September 26 of that year in a format that differed from previous years. Paramount+ first streamed a two-hour ceremony at 7:00 p.m. ET with presentations of the awards for individual categories. CBS then aired a two-hour primetime special, The Tony Awards Present: Broadway's Back!, presented as a concert to "celebrate the joy and magic of live theatre". The special included performances of "beloved classics" and the three Best Musical nominees, and the presentation of the awards for Best Musical, Best Revival of a Play, and Best Play. On September 13, Audra McDonald and Leslie Odom Jr. were announced as hosts of the Tony Awards ceremony and Broadway's Back! special respectively.

In explaining the decision to split the ceremony between two platforms, producers Ricky Kirshner and Glenn Weiss said that allowed for a four-hour ceremony in total, as opposed to the typical three-hour limit imposed on a television-exclusive broadcast. Kirshner said that this also gave the chance to air complete acceptance speeches for winners in all categories, saying "In the past, a lot of these awards have been in a pre-show where they got a 10 second blurb on the air. Now they get their full award on the air."

Performances

Tony Awards

"You Can't Stop the Beat" (from Hairspray) – Marissa Jaret Winokur, Matthew Morrison, Kerry Butler, Chester Gregory & Darlene Love
"What I Did for Love" (from A Chorus Line) – Ali Stroker
"Anyone Can Whistle" (from the musical of the same name) – Jennifer Nettles
"And I Am Telling You I'm Not Going" (from Dreamgirls) – Jennifer Holliday

Broadway's Back!

Source:
"Broadway's Back Tonight!" (opening number) – Leslie Odom Jr.
"Burning Down the House" – American Utopia
"My Girl" / "Ain't Too Proud to Beg" – John Legend and the cast of Ain't Too Proud
"Lady Marmalade" / "Because We Can" – Moulin Rouge!
Broadway Advocacy Coalition
"Move On" (from Sunday in the Park with George) – Ben Platt & Anika Noni Rose
"Ironic" / "All I Really Want" – Jagged Little Pill
"Beautiful City" (from Godspell) – Josh Groban & Odom
"The Impossible Dream (The Quest)" (from Man of La Mancha) – Brian Stokes Mitchell
"Somewhere" (from West Side Story) – Norm Lewis & Kelli O'Hara
"We Don't Need Another Hero (Thunderdome)" / "The Best" / "Proud Mary" – Tina
"It Takes Two" (from Into the Woods) – Tituss Burgess & Andrew Rannells
"You Matter to Me" (from Waitress) – Odom & Nicolette Robinson
"For Good" (from Wicked) – Kristin Chenoweth & Idina Menzel
"What You Own" (from Rent) – Adam Pascal & Anthony Rapp
"Wheels of a Dream" (from Ragtime) – Audra McDonald & Mitchell
Freestyle Love Supreme

Eligibility
The official eligibility cut-off date for Broadway productions opening in the 2019–20 season was originally to have been April 23, 2020. As a result of the COVID-19 pandemic cutting the 2019–20 theatre season short, on August 21, 2020, it was announced that only the 18 shows that opened before February 19, 2020, would be considered eligible. A revival of West Side Story that opened February 20, 2020 and the new musical Girl from the North Country, which opened March 5, 2020, were thus not considered eligible because too few nominators and voters saw them before Broadway shut down on March 12, 2020. Girl From the North Country was nominated the following year.

Original Plays
 A Christmas Carol
 Grand Horizons
 The Great Society
 The Height of the Storm
 The Inheritance
 Linda Vista
 My Name Is Lucy Barton
 Sea Wall/A Life
 Slave Play
 The Sound Inside

Original Musicals
 Jagged Little Pill
 The Lightning Thief: The Percy Jackson Musical
 Moulin Rouge!
 Tina

Play Revivals
 Betrayal
 Frankie and Johnny in the Clair de Lune
 The Rose Tattoo
 A Soldier's Play

Non-competitive awards
Special Tony Awards were given to the following: 
The Broadway Advocacy Coalition 
David Byrne's American Utopia
Freestyle Love Supreme

The award for Lifetime Achievement in the Theatre was given to Graciela Daniele. Julie Halston received the Isabelle Stevenson Award.

Winners and nominees 
Winners are listed first, and are highlighted in boldface:

‡ The award is presented to the producer(s) of the musical or play.

Nominations and awards per production

Reception

Critical reviews
Greg Evans of Deadline Hollywood called the show "truly excellent television", and praised the two-part format, writing "The no-nonsense presentation of award announcements and acceptance speeches was followed by a lively special that impressively showcased contemporary Broadway musicals on their home turfs and classic reunions that felt fresh and welcome." However, he criticized the program's emphasis on musicals, commenting, "the non-musical plays got unforgivably short shrift." In Variety, Clayton Davis praised it as "a sensational awards ceremony" and described the show as "a near flawless and detailed blueprint on how [other awards ceremonies] should assemble their future ceremonies to bring forth an inviting place for people of all backgrounds, and an impeccable pace to keep your attention." He also commended the show's tone, concluding, "The Tonys were pure, not shy about the times we were in — and they sent a signal of hope for our futures."

Conversely, however, Tim Teeman of The Daily Beast dismissed the Broadway's Back! portion of the show as "a purely commercial exercise based on telling people who kind of like theater that Broadway was back, and needs their financial support" and accused the ceremony at large of sending "mixed messages" about its industry, contrasting calls for diversity from winners and presenters with Slave Play, a work which addresses racism as a central theme, failing to win a single award. He also criticized the decision to present the vast majority of awards on the Paramount+ livestream, instead of on the CBS telecast, writing "A Tonys-themed song and dance show may suit ratings-counters at the network [...] But if you're going to show an awards show, show an awards show."

Ratings
The Broadway's Back! special received 2.8 million viewers during its CBS telecast, an approximate 50% decline in viewership from the 73rd Tony Awards in 2019. Rick Porter of The Hollywood Reporter said that the loss may have been attributable to certain mitigating factors, such as most awards being handed out during the Paramount+ portion of the program, and the ceremony taking place in September, as opposed to its usual June date, putting it in conflict with the fall television season.

See also
 Drama Desk Awards
 2020 Laurence Olivier Awards – equivalent awards for West End theatre productions
 Obie Award
 New York Drama Critics' Circle
 Theatre World Award
 Lucille Lortel Awards

References

External links
 

2020s in Manhattan
2021 awards in the United States
2021 in New York City
2021 theatre awards
Tony Awards ceremonies
Impact of the COVID-19 pandemic on television
Impact of the COVID-19 pandemic on the performing arts
Events postponed due to the COVID-19 pandemic
September 2021 events in the United States
Television shows directed by Glenn Weiss